The Is Molas Challenge was a golf tournament on the Challenge Tour. It was played from 1996 to 1999 at Is Molas in Sardinia, Italy.

Winners

References

External links
Coverage on the Challenge Tour's official site

Former Challenge Tour events
Golf tournaments in Italy
Sport in Sardinia